The Orobii (also Orobi, Oromobi or Orumbovii) were a Celto-Ligurian tribe dwelling around present-day Como and Bergamo during the Iron Age.

Name 
They are mentioned as Orobii by Cato the Elder (early 2nd century BC).

The ethnic name Orobii appears to be of Celtic origin.

Some classical writers such as Pliny the Elder thought that their name was of Greek origin, tracing the etymology from the Greek Orōn bion (Ορων βιον).

Geography 
The Orobii dwelled between the modern cities of Como and Bergamo. The Sottoceneri was part of their area of influence.

Their territory was located north of the Gallianates, Bromanenses, and Anesiates, east of the Subinates and Ausuciates, west of the Gennanates, Trumplini and Camunni, south of the Aneuniates.

History 
Modern archaeologists and linguists see the Orobii as a population of Celticized Ligures, or Celtic-Ligures, formed with the contribution of Celtic immigrants from the Rhine and the Danube areas in an early historical period, before the Gallic invasions of the 4th century BC.

Pliny the Elder says they founded the cities of Como, Bergamo, Licini Forum, and Parra.

Culture 
Like the Lepontii and Insubres, the Orobii are associated with the archaeological Golasecca culture.

See also
Ancient peoples of Italy
Cisalpine Gaul
Golasecca culture

References

Bibliography

Ancient peoples of Italy
Historical Celtic peoples
Ligures
Gauls
Golasecca culture